List of presidents of the National Assembly of Senegal.

Below is a list of office-holders:

References

See also
National Assembly (Senegal)

List
Senegal, National Assembly
Lists of political office-holders in Senegal
Senegal